Baraah Awadallah Marouane (born December 21, 1991 in Irbid) is a Jordanian middle distance runner. Awadallah represented Jordan at the 2008 Summer Olympics in Beijing, where she competed for the women's 800 metres. She ran in the first heat of the event, against six other athletes, including Russia's Svetlana Klyuka, who nearly missed out of the medal podium in the final. She finished the race in last place by fifteen seconds behind Australia's Madeleine Pape, with her personal and seasonal best time of 2:18.41. Awadallah, however, failed to advance into the semi-finals, as she placed thirty-seventh overall, and was ranked farther below three mandatory slots for the next round. She was eventually upgraded to a higher overall position, when Croatia's Vanja Perišić had been disqualified for failing the doping test.

References

External links

NBC 2008 Olympics profile

Jordanian female middle-distance runners
Living people
Olympic athletes of Jordan
Athletes (track and field) at the 2008 Summer Olympics
People from Irbid
1991 births